Celebrity Juice is a British television comedy panel game broadcast on ITV2 between 24 September 2008 and 15 December 2022. The show was written and presented by Leigh Francis in the role of his alter ego Keith Lemon. The format for the series was first suggested in 2007, after the final series of Francis' Channel 4 sketch show Bo' Selecta!. ITV approached him to create a show featuring Lemon, and after the success of the five-part series Keith Lemon's Very Brilliant World Tour, the channel commissioned Celebrity Juice. The original premise of the show was to see which team knows most about the week's tabloid news stories, although later series focus more on the comedy factor of the participating celebrity guests and games involving them, rather than discussing the week's news.

Fearne Cotton and Holly Willoughby were the show's original team captains. In December 2018, Cotton announced that she would leave the series after ten years in order to pursue other projects. She was replaced by Paddy McGuinness, though he left after one series and was replaced by Mel B. On 4 May 2020, Willoughby revealed her decision to quit the series after 12 years on the show. She made her final appearance as team captain at the end of the 23rd series. Mel B also departed at the end of series 23. On 10 September 2020, it was announced that Laura Whitmore and Emily Atack had joined the show as team captains. On 29 March 2021, it was announced that Maya Jama had joined the show as a regular panellist. In December 2021, Celebrity Juice became one of three shows by Francis to get recommissioned for 2022, along with ITV2's Shopping with Keith Lemon and the E4/Channel 4 mockumentary series, The Holden Girls: Mandy & Myrtle.

On 29 June 2022, it was announced that Celebrity Juice had been cancelled by ITV; the series concluded with two specials which aired on 8 and 15 December 2022.

Production

Celebrity Juice was filmed at the Riverside Studios from 2008 until 2014. In August 2014 it was announced that the show, along with the BBC's Never Mind the Buzzcocks and Sweat the Small Stuff, would be hosted at Elstree Studios Stage 9 whilst redevelopment takes place at their former home. For its first seven series, the show was produced by Talkback Thames, and it has been produced by Talkback since series eight (Same production company, only re-branded). The show is produced by Dan Baldwin and Leon Wilson.

Transmissions

Merchandise
 A Celebrity Juice calendar was released by Danilo Promotions (22 September 2012), it features 68 pages of classic moments from the show.
 A Celebrity Juice book was released by Orion (26 September 2013). It features 160 pages and was published on a hardback format and kindle version.

Home media

DVD and Blu-ray releases

Online
 Celebrity Juice was previously released on Netflix, although only selected episodes from series seven were available
 On iTunes Series 5, 6, 7, 8, 9, 10, 11 and aired episodes from Series 12 as well as Too Juicy for TV.

Reception

Critical reception
In 2009, 2010 and 2011, the show was voted "Worst British TV Panel Show" in the British Comedy Guide's annual awards. In 2011, the show won the Best Entertainment Show Award at the TV Choice Awards and in 2012, it won an National Television Award for Best Comedy Panel Show and a BAFTA Award for the Best YouTube Audience.

Awards

References

External links
 
 
 
 Celebrity Juice Videos
 
 

2008 British television series debuts
2022 British television series endings
2000s British comedy television series
2010s British comedy television series
2020s British comedy television series
2000s British game shows
2010s British game shows
2020s British game shows
ITV comedy
ITV panel games
Television series by Fremantle (company)
English-language television shows
Television series featuring gunge
Television shows shot at BBC Elstree Centre
Television shows shot at Elstree Film Studios